Woodhouse may refer to:

People 
Woodhouse (surname)

Places 

Woodhouse, Alberta, Canada
Woodhouse, Bradford, a location in West Yorkshire, England
Woodhouse, Calderdale, a location in West Yorkshire, England
Woodhouse, Copeland, a location in Cumbria, England
Woodhouse, Hampshire, a location in England
Woodhouse, Leeds, West Yorkshire, England
Woodhouse Moor, Leeds
Woodhouse Ridge, Leeds
Woodhouse Cemetery, Leeds
Woodhouse, Leicestershire, England
Woodhouse, Lincolnshire, a location in England
Woodhouse, South Lakeland, a location in Cumbria, England
Woodhouse, South Yorkshire, England
 Woodhouse railway station in this area
Woodhouse, Wakefield, a location in West Yorkshire, England
Woodhouse Hill, Huddersfield, West Yorkshire, England
Woodhouse Copse, Isle of Wight, England
Woodhouse Park, Wythenshawe, Manchester, Greater Manchester, England
Woodhouse Township, Ontario, Canada
Annesley Woodhouse, Nottinghamshire, England
Dronfield Woodhouse, Derbyshire, England
Holbeck Woodhouse, Nottinghamshire, England
Horsley Woodhouse, Derbyshire, England
Mansfield Woodhouse, Nottinghamshire, England
Over Woodhouse, Derbyshire, England

Buildings and institutions 

 Woodhouse, County Waterford, a historic house and estate near Stradbally, County Waterford, Ireland.
Woodhouse, Shropshire, a country house in West Felton, Shropshire, England
Woodhouse Chocolate, a famous shop in Napa Valley, California, US
Woodhouse College, a sixth form college in Finchley, North London, England
Woodhouse Copse, Holmbury St Mary, an Arts and Crafts house and operatic venue in Surrey, England
Woodhouse Grammar School, a former secondary school in Finchley, North London, England
Woodhouse Grove School, independent school in Apperly Bridge, West Yorkshire, England
Woodhouse High School, former name of Landau Forte Academy, Amington, a school in Tamworth, Staffordshire, England
Woodhouse House (Virginia Beach, Virginia), US
The Wodehouse, formerly spelled the Woodhouse, a country house near Wombourne, Staffordshire, notable for its connections with British musical history.
Wentworth Woodhouse, a country house near Rotherham, South Yorkshire, England

See also
P. G. Wodehouse
Wodehouse (disambiguation)
Wild man, also known as wodwo, wodehouse or woodwose, mythological figure